The Liberal Party of Australia (Victorian Division), branded as Liberal Victoria, and commonly known as the Victorian Liberals, is the state division of the Liberal Party of Australia in Victoria. It was formed in 1949 as the Liberal and Country Party (LCP), and simplified its name to the Liberal Party in 1965.

There was a previous Victorian division of the Liberal Party when the Liberal Party was formed in 1945, but it ceased to exist and merged to form the LCP in March 1949.

History

Background
Robert Menzies, who was the Prime Minister of Australia between 1939 and 1941, founded the Liberal Party during a conference held in Canberra in October 1944, uniting many non-Labor political organisations, including the United Australia Party (UAP) and the Australian Women's National League (AWNL).

The UAP was a major conservative party in Australia and last governed Victoria between May 1932 and April 1935 under Stanley Argyle's leadership. Argyle lost premiership when the UAP's coalition partner United Country Party led by Albert Dunstan broke off the coalition and formed a minority government with Labor's support. After Argyle's death in late 1941, Thomas Hollway became the leader of the UAP in Victoria.  During his time as UAP leader, he was the Deputy Premier in the Dunstan coalition government since September 1943.

The AWNL was a conservative women's organisation founded and originally based in Victoria, but had expanded across Australia since World War I. Its leaders included Dame Elizabeth Couchman and future senator Ivy Wedgwood, both of whom were from Victoria. During the October 1944 conference, the AWNL was recognised by Menzies as one of the long-standing non-Labor organisations in Victoria.

The Liberal Party in Victoria was established between December 1944 and January 1945, with the names of the provisional state executive revealed on 29 December 1944 and the first meeting held a week later on 5 January 1945. The state executive included AWNL's leaders Couchman and Wedgwood. The AWNL joined the Liberal Party on 30 January 1945. The UAP and its parliamentary members (including Hollway) joined the Liberal Party on 5 March 1945, with the state parliamentary UAP becoming the state parliamentary Liberal Party. As a result, Hollway became the first parliamentary leader of the Victorian branch of the Liberal Party.

Old Liberal Party Victorian Division
On 2 October 1945, deputy Liberal Party leader Ian Macfarlan was commissioned by the Governor Sir Winston Dugan to form government, when it was clear that the Victorian Legislative Assembly would not grant supply to the Dunstan government. The Liberals were defeated in the election a month later, which was won by Labor.

By the 1947 Victorian state election, the Liberals were again in coalition with the Country Party (renamed from United Country Party) and contested the election together. The coalition won the election and governed Victoria as majority government from 20 November 1947 to 3 December 1948, with Liberal leader Hollway as Premier and Country leader John McDonald as Deputy Premier.

Liberal and Country Party

Formation
During a series of transport strikes in 1948, the moderate Hollway had dealt amicably with the transport unions and the Trades Hall Council, and McDonald heavily criticised his conciliatory approach to the conservative parties' traditional enemies. Hollway forced McDonald to resign as deputy. Wilfrid Kent Hughes, deputy leader of Liberal Party, was appointed as Deputy Premier.

In February 1949, the Liberal Party planned to form a new Liberal and Country Party (LCP), with metropolitan-country interests proposed to be represented on a 50-50 basis. Hollway hoped this would unite the two "anti-socialist" parties of Liberal Party and Country Party together, an idea supported by Liberal Party and Country Party voters. A merger of the Liberal and Country parties had already happened in South Australia with the formation of the Liberal and Country League in 1932.  The Liberal Party conference on 22 February 1949 endorsed the idea of a merger. However, the idea was rejected by the Country Party and argued it was a takeover attempt of the Country Party, and to eliminate the Country Party from Victorian politics entirely.

However, six Country MPs were willing to take part in a United party. On 22 March 1949, they joined the Liberals in forming the Liberal and Country Party (LCP). Hollway was chosen as leader of the new party and continued to be Premier. Hughes also continued to be deputy leader of the new party and Deputy Premier. The six former Country MPs were eligible for Cabinet positions in the new LCP government, but turned them down since "the present cabinet had prepared legislation for the new parliamentary session" and "should carry on with it". As such, the incumbent cabinet composition was unchanged. The LCP succeeded the old Victorian Liberal Party to be the Victorian division of the Liberal Party of Australia, and federal members endorsed by the LCP sat with the Liberals in Canberra and belonged to the federal parliamentary Liberal Party.

Future Prime Minister John Gorton was one of those appointed to the state executive of the LCP. He used to support the Country Party since before the war, but became frustrated with the party's squabbles with the Liberal Party and willingness to co-opoerate with the Labor Party. While being part of the LCP state executive, he had addressed Country Party gatherings in a few occasions, urging its members to join the new party and stressing that it would not neglect rural interests, as many feared. However, the Country Party were not convinced and never joined the new party.

The LCP, Country Party and Labor Party contested against one another in the 1949 Legislative Council election in June. John Lienhop, who was a member of the Bendigo Province and previously elected as a Country Party member, contested the electorate as an LCP member and managed to retain the seat.

Despite their differences, the LCP and Country Party agreed to endorse the same candidates for 10 seats in Victoria for the 1949 federal election in December, minimising three-cornered contests. The federal Liberal/Country coalition led by Robert Menzies won the election, winning 20 out of the 33 lower house seats in Victoria.

Loss of government
The LCP continued to govern Victoria independently as a minority government until 27 June 1950, when the Victorian Labor agreed to support a minority Country Party government led by McDonald.

In December 1951, Hollway and his deputy Trevor Oldham were replaced by Les Norman and Henry Bolte as party leader and deputy leader respectively. In September 1952, Hollway and 7 LCP members were expelled from the LCP after a dispute over electoral reform issues. In October, Labor Party moved to defeat the McDonald government by working with two of Hollway's supporters in the Victorian Legislative Council to block supply in the upper house. Hollway was commissioned by Governor Sir Dallas Brooks to form a minority government with the 7 former LCP members, known as the Electoral Reform League, with the backing of the Labor Party on confidence and supply. However, 70 hours later, Brooks forced Hollway to resign and recommissioned McDonald as Premier.

At the state election two months later in December 1952, Hollway contested Norman's seat of Glen Iris and won. Neither Country Party, LCP nor the Electoral Reform League won enough seats to form government. With Norman losing his seat, Oldham was elected as leader and Bolte remained the deputy leader. Oldham and his wife died in a plane crash in India on 2 May 1953, on their way to England to attend the coronation of Queen Elizabeth II, and Bolte succeeded him as LCP leader.

In 1954, Hollway and his supporters formed the Victorian Liberal Party, replacing the Electoral Reform League. Despite the name, it was a separate party to the LCP or the Liberal Party.

Following the Australian Labor Party split of 1955 that led to the weakening of the governing Victorian Labor, the LCP led by Bolte won the 1955 Victorian state election and formed government for the next 27 years independently without a coalition with the Country Party. All members of Hollway's Victorian Liberal Party including Hollway lost all their seats in this election, and the party ceased to exist.

Liberal Party

Change of name to Liberal Party
As one of the conditions of the Country Party supporting the government's supply bill in the Legislative Council on 27 October 1964, the 'and Country' was to be dropped from the name of the Liberal and Country Party. During the party's State Council in March 1965, the party debated for more than an hour on its party name. It was revealed through a letter from Menzies that he did not like the "Liberal and Country Party" name because "liberalism catered for people in the city and in the country". With the letter, Bolte managed to persuade the party to support the motion of change of name back to the original name of Liberal Party.

Malcolm Fraser, the Prime Minister between 1975 and 1983, is to date the last Liberal Prime Minister from Victoria. His immediate successor Andrew Peacock, who served from 1983 to 1985, and again from 1989 to 1990, is the most recent Victorian federal Liberal leader.

The Liberal Party continued to hold government in the Victorian state parliament until 1982 under the leaderships of Bolte, Rupert Hamer and Lindsay Thompson.

Opposition (1982–1992)
The Liberals were defeated in the 1982 Victorian state election after governing Victoria for 27 years. Following the Liberals' defeat, Jeff Kennett became the leader of the party. Kennett was deposed as leader following the 1988 Victorian state election, and was replaced by Alan Brown. During Brown's leadership, the Liberals reached a new Coalition agreement with the Victorian Nationals, led by Pat McNamara since 1988.

Kennett became party leader again in 1991 and led the Coalition to victory in the 1992 Victorian state election. The Liberals actually won majorities in their own right. Although Kennett thus had no need for the support of the Nationals, he retained the Coalition, with McNamara as Deputy Premier.

Kennett government
The Liberal and National Coalition held government from 1992 to 1999 under Kennett's leadership. The Kennett government privatised many government services, including closing down over three hundred schools. The Liberals and Nationals fought as a Coalition in the 1996, which the LIberals won majority in its own right again, and 1999, which the Coalition was defeated.

Opposition (1999–2010)
McNamara's successor as Nationals leader, Peter Ryan, ended the Coalition agreement. Since then, Liberals and Nationals had a strained relationship. Ryan uttered several sharp criticisms of the Liberals' most prominent figures, particularly their no-tolls policy on the Melbourne Eastlink freeway and on former leader Robert Doyle's remarks that the Liberals were twenty seats from government, a statement that assumed that the Nationals would support a Liberal government. Relations soured further at the beginning of 2006 when Victorian Senator Julian McGauran defected from the Nationals to the Liberals.

The Liberal Party was the sole opposition party in Victoria until 2008, when Liberals under Ted Baillieu formed a new Coalition agreement with the Nationals.

Baillieu & Napthine governments

After the 2010 Victorian state election, the Liberal and National Coalition held government under Baillieu's leadership. On 7 March 2013 Baillieu resigned from his position of Premier of Victoria and he was replaced by Denis Napthine. Napthine led the Coalition to a defeat in the 2014 Victorian state election.

Opposition and shift further to the right (since 2014)
After the 2014 election, Matthew Guy was elected leader. The Coalition arrangement was maintained while the Liberals and Nationals were in opposition. The coalition lost the 2018 election and suffered a significant swing against it, leading to the resignation of Guy as leader of the Liberal Party. He was replaced by Michael O'Brien as party leader.

Branch stacking allegations in the party had been linked to conservative powerbroker Marcus Bastiaan since 2016. In late August 2020, his activities in branch stacking were revealed by Nine/The Age, which included directing taxpayer-funded electorate staff working for federal MP Kevin Andrews to be involved with party activities such as recruitment of party members, which is illegal by federal or state law, recruiting members to the party by paying for their membership, and adding party members to seats under fake residential addresses. Bastiaan's activities were allegedly endorsed by Michael Sukkar, another conservative federal MP who was a minister within the Morrison ministry. Just a week earlier, internal audit by the party found some members breached party rules by paying for other people's membership fees.

On 6 September 2021, a few Liberal MPs including Guy resigned from O'Brien's shadow cabinet or from parliamentary party positions. O'Brien refused to step down as party leader as "he believed he had the support of the majority of MPs" ahead of a possible leadership challenge. The following day, Guy replaced O'Brien as party leader in a leadership spill. Cindy McLeish was replaced by David Southwick as deputy party leader.

According to The Age, between November 2018 and November 2021, the Coalition's Legislative Council members voted with the Andrews Government's position 28.9% of the time; of the parties in the Legislative Council, only the Liberal Democratic Party had a lower figure (22.1%).

Following the 2022 Victorian state election, the party's director Sam McQuestin, stepped down citing 'internal challenges' in the months leading into the state election. McQuestin is set to be replaced by West Australian Liberal party state director Stuart Smith after a three-month search.

Victorian Liberal leaders

Victorian Liberal deputy leaders

Senior Figures

State presidents of the Victorian Liberal Party
1945–1948: William Anderson

1948–1949: Magnus Cormack

1949–1950: Dan Mackinnon

1950–1952: William Anderson

1952–1956: John Anderson

1956–1959: Rutherford Guthrie

1959–1962: John Buchan

1962–1965: William Snell

1965–1966: Andrew Peacock

1966–1970: Robert Southey

1970–1973: Phillip Russell

1973–1976: Peter Hardie

1976–1979: Joy Mein

1979–1982: Richard Alston

1982–1984: Stewart McArthur

1984–1987: Eda Ritchie

1987–1992: Michael Kroger

1992–1998: Ted Baillieu

1997–2000: Joy Howley

2000–2003: Ian Carson

2003–2006: Helen Kroger

2006–2007: Russell Hannan

2007–2011: David Kemp

2011–2015: Tony Snell

2015–2018: Michael Kroger

2019–2022: Robert Clark 

2022-Current: Greg Mirabella

State Directors of the Victorian Liberal Party

1945–1971: J V McConnell

1971–1974: Leo Hawkins

1975–1976: Timothy Pascoe

1976–1977: Graham Jennings

1977–1983: Neville Hughes

1984–1987: John Ridley

1987–1988: David Kemp

1989–1994: Petro Georgiou

1994–2000: Peter Poggioli

2000–2003: Brian Loughnane

2003–2008: Julian Sheezel

2008–2011: Tony Nutt

2011–2015: Damien Mantach

2015–2017: Simon Frost

2017–2019: Nick Demiris

2019–present: Sam McQuestin

Election results

Liberal Party (1945–1949)

Liberal and Country Party (1949–1965) & Liberal Party (since 1965)

Federal Elections

See also
 National Party of Australia – Victoria

References
Notes

Citations

Parliament of Victoria
Victoria
Political parties in Victoria (Australia)